Geoffrey Kirby (6 November 1923 – 7 January 2004) was an English cricketer. He played 23 first-class matches for Surrey between 1947 and 1953.

See also
 List of Surrey County Cricket Club players

References

External links
 

1923 births
2004 deaths
English cricketers
Surrey cricketers
Sportspeople from Reading, Berkshire
North v South cricketers